"That's Rock 'n' Roll" is a song written and originally recorded by Eric Carmen in 1976. It became a popular Billboard top 10 hit in 1977 for teen idol Shaun Cassidy.

Eric Carmen version

Background
American pop rock artist Eric Carmen released his version of "That's Rock 'n' Roll" in some nations as the third single from his first eponymous debut album, Eric Carmen. The single's limited release did not include the United States.  The song charted at number seven in Denmark. Parts of the song are autobiographical.

Carmen performed the song on the Midnight Special TV program on March 26, 1976.

In 1988, "That's Rock 'n' Roll" was featured as the B side of a subsequent major hit by Carmen, "Make Me Lose Control."

Chart performance

Shaun Cassidy version

Background
"That's Rock 'n' Roll" was covered in 1976 by American teen idol Shaun Cassidy on his first solo LP, Shaun Cassidy. It was Cassidy's second of three consecutive Top 10 hits.  The following lyrics are omitted from his version: 

"Well it's the roadies and the crowd, It's when the band's playin' way too loud, Your hips are shakin', ain't no mistakin'."

"That's Rock 'n' Roll" peaked at number three on the U.S. Billboard Hot 100.  It was his longest-charting hit, and spent three weeks longer in the Top 40 than did his number one hit, "Da Doo Ron Ron", with a total of six months on the chart. This song became a gold record, as did all of Cassidy's first three single releases.

"That's Rock and Roll" was the first of two major hits written by Carmen and covered by Cassidy, the second being "Hey Deanie".  Both songs charted concurrently with Carmen's own hit, "She Did It" from the fall of 1977.

On the Canadian chart, "That's Rock 'n' Roll" reached number one for one week, displacing the 'Star Wars Theme' to take its turn at number one.  It was Cassidy's second Canadian number-one hit.  It was also Eric Carmen's second composition to reach the top spot, having reached number one a year earlier with a song he performed himself, "Never Gonna Fall in Love Again."

Chart performance

Weekly charts

Year-end charts

Certifications and sales

Other versions
The song has also been covered by:
The British rock 'n' roll band Showaddywaddy and in 1977.
Tina Arena and John Bowles recorded a version for their album Tiny Tina and Little John. 
A version with slightly modified lyrics was recorded by The Dwarves in 1993. 
Billie Joe Armstrong from Green Day covered the song in 2020 as part of his "No Fun Mondays" series on YouTube.

References

External links
 
 
 

1975 songs
1976 singles
1977 singles
Shaun Cassidy songs
Eric Carmen songs
Songs written by Eric Carmen
Song recordings produced by Jimmy Ienner
Song recordings produced by Michael Lloyd
Arista Records singles
Warner Records singles
Songs about rock music
RPM Top Singles number-one singles